780 North Highland Avenue is a historic building in the Virginia-Highland neighborhood of Atlanta, Georgia. It is a contributing property to the Virginia-Highland Historic District, registered on the National Register of Historic Places. The NRHP designation, however, affords no prevention of either demolishing the building or altering its exterior—only designation as a local historic district does so.

History
In June 1999, developer Doug Landau had bought the building, then known as "The Alley", and had plans to demolish it make a parking structure. The Virginia-Highland Civic Association fought against those plans, which eventually failed.

A Wolf Camera store on the site closed in 2007. In April 2012 Glamour Paws, a pet boutique, opened in the space after a controversial renovation lasting several months.

Controversy
In February 2012 controversy surfaced over the renovation of the building, in which the historic details of the building were covered up under a layer of wood, over which a new façade was to be constructed. Though the historic façade was not legally protected, dozens of local residents expressed dismay at its being covered up, while a smaller group defended the merchants' right to design their storefront as they deemed best.

Filming on location
In April 2012 portions of the pilot for the B.E.T. network's Being Mary Jane were filmed here.

Portions of the Bravo television series Married to Medicine were filmed here in 2013.

References

External links
 Leasing brochure (2011), Vantage Real Estate (PDF)

Buildings and structures in Atlanta
Historic district contributing properties in Georgia (U.S. state)